Sherry is both a given name and surname. Notable people with the name include:



Given name
 Sherry Alberoni (born 1946), American actress and voice artist
 Sherry Anderson (born 1964), Canadian curler
 Sherry Appleton (born 1942), American politician from Washington state
 Sherry Boschert, American author, journalist, and activist
 Sherry Calvert (born 1951), American javelin thrower
 Sherry Chen (politician) (born 1955), South African politician
 Sherry Chen (actress) (born 1983), Hong Kong actress
 Sherry Chen (hydrologist), American scientist falsely accused of spying for China
Sherry Chou, Canadian neurologist
Sherry Edmundson Fry (1879–1966), American sculptor
 Sherry Gay-Dagnogo (born 1967), American politician from Michigan
Sherry Gambin-Walsh, Canadian politician
 Sherry Glaser (born 1960), American actress, performance artist, and political activist
 Sherry Grace (born c. 1954), American activist, founder of Mothers of Incarcerated Sons
 Sherry Harbin, American academic
 Sherry Hawco (1964–1991), Canadian artistic gymnast
 Sherry Jackson (born 1942), American actress and child star
 Sherry Kean ( 1980s), Canadian pop and country singer
 Sherry Lansing (born 1944), American actress and film studio executive
 Sherry Lawrence (born 1984), Canadian alpine skier
 Sherry Lynn (born 1952), American voice actress
 Sherry Magee (1884–1929), American baseball left fielder
 Sherry Middaugh (born 1966), Canadian curler
 Sherry Miller (born 1955), Canadian actress
 Sherry Ortner (born 1941), American cultural anthropologist
 Sherry Rich, Australian alternative country singer-songwriter and guitarist
 Sherry Robertson (1919–1970), Canadian-American baseball outfielder and second baseman
 Sherry Romanado (born 1974), Canadian politician
 Sherry Ross (born c. 1954), American ice hockey broadcaster and journalist
 Sherry Smith (1891–1949), American baseball pitcher
 Sherry Stringfield (born 1967), American television actress
 Sherry Sylvester, American political worker and journalist
 Sherry Thomas (born 1975), American novelist
 Sherry Tsai (born 1983), Hong Kong swimmer
 Sherry Turkle (born 1948), American professor of the Social Studies of Science and Technology
 Sherry Wilson, Canadian politician from New Brunswick
 Sherry Wolf (born 1949), American photorealist painter and fashion designer

Surname
 Andy Sherry (born 1943), British karate practitioner
 David Sherry (philosopher), American philosopher
 David Sherry (artist) (born 1974), artist from Northern Ireland
 David Benjamin Sherry (born 1981), American photographer
 Fionnuala Sherry (born 1962), Irish violinist and vocalist
 Fred Sherry (born 1948), American cellist
 Fred Sherry (baseball) (1889–1975), American baseball pitcher
 Gerry Sherry ( 1926), American football player
 J. Barney Sherry (1874–1944), American actor of the silent film era
 Jack Sherry ( 1952–1954), American football and basketball player
 James Sherry (born 1967), Australian television presenter and actor
 Janice Sherry (born 1960), Canadian politician
 Larry Sherry (1935–2006), American baseball pitcher
 Louis Sherry (1855–1926), American restaurateur, caterer, confectioner and hotelier
 Matt Sherry (born 1984), American football tight end 
 Mike Sherry (born 1988), Irish rugby union player
 Nick Sherry (born 1955), Australian politician
 Norm Sherry (1931–2021), American catcher, manager, and coach in Major League Baseball
 Norman Sherry (1925–2016), English born American novelist, biographer, and educator
 Ray Sherry (1924–1989), Australian politician from Sydney
 Suzanna Sherry, American professor in the area of constitutional law
 Sylvia Sherry (born 1932), English writer
 Tom Sherry (1881–1971), Australian rules footballer
 William Grant Sherry (1914–2003), American painter and artist

See also
 Sherry (disambiguation)
Feminine given names

English feminine given names
Surnames of English origin
Surnames of British Isles origin
English-language surnames